Mazzara is a surname. Notable people with the surname include:

Alessandro Mazzara (born 2004), Italian skateboarder
Glen Mazzara (born 1967), American television producer and writer
Maïa Mazzara (born 2003), French figure skater
Sebastiano Mazzara (born 1975), Italian long-distance runner